

People
 Annie Massy (1867–1931), Irish marine biologist and ornithologist
 Arnaud Massy, French professional golfer
 Baron Massy in the Peerage of Ireland
 George Godfrey Massy Wheeler V.C.
 Hugh Massy (British Army officer), Lieutenant General Hugh Royds Stokes Massy, British Army General
 Montagu Massy-Westropp, Australian rugby union player
 Pierre Massy, Dutch footballer
 R. H. Massy-Westropp, Irish rugby union player
 Sylvia Massy, American entrepreneur, record producer

Places
 Massy, Essonne, a commune in the Essonne department, France
 Massy, Saône-et-Loire, a commune in the Saône-et-Loire department, France
 Massy, Seine-Maritime, a commune in the Seine-Maritime department, France
 Massy, Kyrgyzstan, village in Nooken District, Jalal-Abad Province, Kyrgyzstan